My Circuitboard City is a single  by English indie pop band The Wombats. The single was released on 2 March 2009 on CD and digital download.  Like its predecessor single Is This Christmas? it was a standalone release and does not feature on any of the band's albums.  It reached number 69 on the UK Singles Chart.

Track listings

Chart performance

Release history

References

2009 singles
The Wombats songs
2009 songs
14th Floor Records singles
Songs written by Matthew Murphy
Songs written by Tord Øverland Knudsen
Songs written by Dan Haggis